The first six days of December 1953 produced a destructive and deadly tornado outbreak sequence across the Southern United States. There were 19 confirmed tornadoes, including a violent F4 tornado that hit the northwest side of Alexandria, Louisiana and even more violent F5 tornado that hit Vicksburg, Mississippi. In all, the tornadoes killed 49 people, injured 404 others, and caused $45,709 million (1953 USD) in damage. This was the last in a series of deadly and catastrophic outbreaks to strike the US in 1953.

Background
1953 had already been extremely deadly tornado season due to multiple outbreaks that affected a vast majority of the country in the Spring and Early-Summer. In particular, tornadoes in Waco, Texas, Flint, Michigan, and Worcester, Massachusetts had taken 324 lives and injured thousands more. Tornado activity had slowed down heading into July, however, with no fatal tornadoes having occurred from July to November. Climatologically, however, the Southeast can routinely provide favorable conditions for tornado outbreaks in the Winter months and on December 1, 1953, a mile-wide F3 tornado southeast of Seguin, Texas kicked off six straight days of active and deadly tornado activity.

Meteorological synopsis
At least three low-pressure systems formed and moved northward over the Great Plains. Adequate moisture and wind shear on the warm side of the system allowed for repeated rounds of severe and tornadic supercells and squall lines over a six-day period. The outbreak ended as a surface anti-cyclone pushed through the region.

Daily statistics

Confirmed Tornadoes

December 1 event

December 2 event

December 3 event

December 4 event

December 5 event

December 6 event

Fort Polk–Northwestern Alexandria–Dry Prong–Tullos, Louisiana

This deadly, long-tracked, violent F4 tornado—which was likely a tornado family—embedded within a much larger area of damaging straight-line winds, heavy rain, and asharp temperature gradient moved over an erratic path, devastating areas in and near Fort Polk, Alexandria, Georgetown Kisatchie National Forest during the early-morning hours of December 3. It first touched down in Fort Polk and moved northeastward towards Alexandria, causing mostly heavy tree damage. It then moved off the Fort and moved through Lacamp and clipping the northwest side of Leander, causing tremendous damage with four homes in Leander incurring F4-level damage. Many other homes, barns, and other buildings were damaged or destroyed as well. Throughout Vernon Parish, the tornado killed seven (all in Leander), injured 20, and caused $2.5 million in damage.

The tornado then moved into Rapides Parish, reportedly damaging the town of Hineston. It then moved back into rural areas before striking the town of Otis. It clipped the northwest side of the Claiborne Range before moving over the Kincaid Reservoir into far western Alexandria. As it continued northeastward, major damage was inflicted to the northwest side of city in Lee Heights as well as to the Kingsville neighborhood. At the latter place, the tornado destroyed or damaged 20 homes. The tornado then made an abrupt turn to the north-northwest (possibly occluding or reforming), striking the Paradise community east of Tioga causing significant property damage. A trailer with four sleeping highway employees was thrown , although all the people survived. Damage was also inflicted to the present-day town of Ball and Camp Beauregard as well with four buildings being destroyed and 43 others being damaged in the latter location. Throughout Rapides Parish, the tornado injured 10 people and caused $5 million in damage.

After entering Grant Parish and striking the site of the Pollock Municipal Airport, the tornado hit the town of Bentley, heavily damaging it. It then paralleled US 167 and struck the town of Dry Prong. From there, the tornado, either through reformation or just a sharp right turn, started traveling northeastward, clipping Western Breezy Hill and Western Lincecum before heavily damaging Mudville as it crossed over US 165 (which at the time was concurrent with LA 24 and LA 14). It then passed through the town of Selma as well as the east side of Georgetown. Throughout Grant Parish, the tornado destroyed two homes, many barns, and other buildings, damaged 25 other homes damaged, injured five people and caused $7.5 million in damage.

The tornado then entered La Salle Parish with catastrophic results. Heavy damage was done in a rural area before the tornado struck Tullos. Damage here was severe as approximately 60 homes and many other buildings were damaged or destroyed, two small children were killed and 15 other people were injured. Thousands of trees were damaged in this area as well, many of which were downed or splintered, before the tornado rapidly weakened and dissipated. Damage in and around Tullos was estimated at $2.5 million.

It also caused damaged mostly harvested crops and agricultural supplies in storage, while damaging or destroying thousands of trees as well. It killed nine people, injured 50, and caused $17.5 million in damage. The same storm produced very severe lightning with little thunder that affected Colfax. Grazulis listed the event as three separate tornado events from different storms rather than the same storm with the F4 tornado being the last of three; he rated the other two tornadoes F2.

Delta, Louisiana/Downtown Vicksburg–Waltersville, Mississippi

On December 5, a powerful and destructive tornado touched down over Southern Delta, Louisiana and crossed the Yazoo River in Warren County, Mississippi and struck Downtown Vicksburg, causing major devastation throughout the city. It destroyed electrical services and multiple buildings in and around downtown, ignited several fires, and totaled numerous automobiles. In total, 38 people were killed, 270 others received injuries, and total damages were estimated at $25 million. The tornado is officially estimated to have been an F5 tornado on the Fujita scale; however, the rating is questionable, since the tornado demolished frail structures. Tornado researcher Thomas P. Grazulis classified the tornado as an F4.

Non-tornadic effects
On December 1, severe thunderstorm winds destroyed several barns and chicken houses, damaged a house, and blew down a few trees in Huntsville, Texas. Several fronts produced strong winds throughout various regions on December 4, causing severe damage and several casualties. In Southeastern Wisconsin, one person was killed and another was injured while in Central Arizona, there were seven injuries and one death. Additionally, severe thunderstorm winds injured seven people near Clarksdale, Mississippi on December 5.

Aftermath and recovery

The F4 tornado in Louisiana temporarily knocked out power to the Alexandria area, hampering communications. At one point the twister was actually headed directly towards the downtown area, but fortunately narrowly missed it as well the VA hospital five miles north of the city. No one was injured and no property damage was reported there or in the city.

In Vicksburg, Mississippi, the F5 tornado broke the city's gas line, which remained out of service after repairs. Residents were forced to go without cooked food even as temperatures dropped to  overnight on December 6.

See also
1966 Candlestick Park tornado outbreak – A small, but significant outbreak that produced a powerful F5 tornado that devastated portions of Jackson, Mississippi
2011 Philadelphia, Mississippi tornado – First of two EF5 tornadoes in Mississippi during the 2011 Super Outbreak
2011 Smithville, Mississippi tornado – Second of two EF5 tornadoes in Mississippi during the 2011 Super Outbreak
List of F5 and EF5 tornadoes
List of tornadoes and tornado outbreaks
List of North American tornadoes and tornado outbreaks

Notes

References

F5 tornadoes
Tornadoes of 1953
Tornadoes in Louisiana
Tornadoes in Mississippi
Tornadoes in Arkansas
Tornadoes in Texas
Tornadoes in Oklahoma
Tornadoes in Alabama
Tornadoes in Georgia (U.S. state)
Tornadoes in Florida
Tornado 1953-12
Tornado 1953-12
Tornado 1953-12
Tornado 1953-12
Tornado 1953-12
Tornado 1953-12
Tornado 1953-12
Tornado 1953-12
Tornado 1953-12
Tornado